The Naked Bunyip is a 1970 Australian documentary film directed by John B. Murray. The film explores sex in Australia using a fictional framework.

Synopsis

The Naked Bunyip is a sex documentary and a blend of fact and fiction; "[it] incorporates the fictionalizing of the 'real' that had been a feature of tendencies in French 'new wave' and the American avant-garde narrative cinema." Graeme Blundell plays a shy young man who works for an ad agency, and the agency hires him to survey about sex in Australia. The film consists of "unrehearsed and unscripted" interviews as Blundell's character investigates a variety of sexual experiences, all except for the "normal" heterosexual experience.

Among the people interviewed are Dame Edna Everage, Jacki Weaver, Aggy Read, Harry M. Miller, and Russell Morris.

Production
Phillip Adams and John Murray decided to make the film after much study of the Australian film industry at the time, noting the popularity of 16mm travel documentaries shown in public halls in the suburbs and the country. They decided to make a comic film about sex as the most commercial option. Finance was provided almost entirely by tyre dealer Bob Jane and it was shot on 16mm.

Release

Murray chose to exhibit The Naked Bunyip himself rather than use a distributor, often using his own equipment, hiring theatres directly and handling his own publicity. This proved successful and the movie ended up running for two years in cinemas.

It led to director Tim Burstall also deciding to use the direct approach for his comedy film Stork in 1971.  The Naked Bunyip was the stepping stone for Australian film distribution in the 1970s, leading to Australian films' presence at international festivals and the US release of Mad Max in 1979.

Censorship controversy
The Commonwealth censors insisted on five minutes of footage being removed but the producers refused, simply blacking out the offending images and bleeping the soundtrack. On the black footage, Murray inserted a picture of a bunyip performing a parody of the forbidden action. Murray also previewed the film without cuts to censors, angering the censor. This led to a debate about censorship which helped lead to a reform of censorship standards.

Footnotes

References

External links

The Naked Bunyip at Oz Movies
John B. Murray, 'Genesis of The Naked Bunyip ' at Senses of Cinema

1970 films
1970 documentary films
Documentary films about sexuality
Australian documentary films
Films shot in 16 mm film
1970s English-language films